Mount Gilbert is the sixth-highest named mountain of the Ruby Mountains and the eighth-highest in Elko County, in Nevada, United States. It is the forty-third-highest mountain in the state. It rises from the head of Seitz Canyon, and is part of the west wall of Right Fork Canyon (a branch of Lamoille Canyon).

References 

Ruby Mountains
Mountains of Elko County, Nevada
Mountains of Nevada
Humboldt–Toiyabe National Forest